Roger D. Jones (born 1953) is an American physicist and entrepreneur. He currently is a Research Fellow at the European Centre for Living Technology at the University of Venice, Italy.

Scientific Interests
Jones, trained in physics at Dartmouth College, worked as a staff physicist at Los Alamos National Laboratory from 1979 to 1995. His primary research interests were in plasma physics, laser fusion, and machine learning. Jones's current interests are in molecular computation in biological systems and serious gaming. He is currently involved in a European-Union project to personalize treatment for diabetic kidney disease.

Startups
Jones, along with other Santa Fe scientists and entrepreneurs such as Doyne Farmer, Norman Packard, Stuart Kauffman, John Casti, and David Weininger, founded several high-technology startup companies in the emerging Santa Fe technology community, dubbed by Wired Magazine as the "Info Mesa". Much of the effort of these startups focused on finance and the catastrophic reinsurance industry. A later successful startup, Qforma, focused on healthcare analytics.

Center for Adaptive Systems Applications
The Center for Adaptive Systems Applications (CASA) was a company founded in 1995 by Jones, together with physicists Robert Stellingwerf, Camilo Gomez, and Stephen Coggeshall and business developer John Davies from Los Alamos National Laboratory in collaboration with Citibank. The company applied neural network and adaptive technology to consumer banking. The company was one of several companies that spun off from Los Alamos and the Santa Fe Institute that focused on banking, finance, and retail applications.

CASA applied machine learning, adaptive computation, and other data mining techniques to the prediction of customer behavior. The first applications were in consumer banking, specifically the prediction of personal bankruptcy and credit card delinquency for Citibank. The product offerings and projects expanded into smart agriculture, retail products, and management consulting.

The company was acquired by HNC Software in March 2000 at the peak of the dotcom boom. HNC Software was subsequently acquired by Fair Isaac Corporation. Much of the technology developed at CASA became part of the credit scoring offerings of Fair Isaac.

Qforma
Qforma was founded in 2000 by Jones, pharmaceutical executive Kelly Myers, John Casti, and Robert MacDonald. The company, initially called CommodiCast, worked in the financial services sector. By 2006, the company switched to healthcare analytics. The flagship product was a social network that inferred the relationships among physicians in North America. The company merged with Skila Mederi in 2013.

Platform Economy
More recently, Jones has started companies in the transportation, real-estate, and book-publishing industries using the Platform-Economy model. Platform companies are those that have little or no inventory, such as bookstores without books, taxi companies without cars, or hotels without rooms. Examples of platform companies are Amazon.com, Uber, and Airbnb.

See also
BiosGroup
Prediction Company

References

Living people
21st-century American physicists
American computer businesspeople
People from Santa Fe, New Mexico
Dartmouth College alumni
1953 births
Computational physicists